The Glassboro Summit Conference, usually just called the Glassboro Summit, was the 23–25 June 1967 meeting of the heads of government of the United States and the Soviet Union—President Lyndon B. Johnson and Premier Alexei Kosygin, respectively—for the purpose of discussing Soviet Union–United States relations in Glassboro, New Jersey. During the Arab–Israeli Six-Day War diplomatic contact and cooperation increased, leading some to hope for an improvement in the two countries' relations.  Some even hoped for joint cooperation on the Vietnam War. Although Johnson and Kosygin failed to reach agreement on anything important, the generally amicable atmosphere of the summit was referred to as the "Spirit of Glassboro" and is seen to have improved Soviet–US relations.

Background

With the United States gradually losing ground in the Vietnam War, the administration was looking for other solutions to the conflict.

On 5 June 1967 the Six-Day War began between Israel and the Arab states. The war led to an increase in Soviet-US diplomatic contact and cooperation; there were some who hoped this could continue to help the US solve the Vietnam war and other pressing international issues. On June 10, 1967, Premier Alexei Kosygin wrote a letter to contact President Lyndon B. Johnson. The "hot line" message arrived at the White House to seek communication between the United States and the Soviet Union. Alexei Kosygin gives a quick explanation of what the Soviet Union and United States should do in regards to the Middle Eastern Crisis. In the message Alexei Kosygin writes:

Several days later the Soviet Union sent Premier Alexei Kosygin to New York City to deliver a speech on the then-ongoing Middle Eastern crisis at the United Nations headquarters. When the United States government was informed of this the Americans gladly welcomed Kosygin to a meeting between him and President Lyndon B. Johnson. On 13 June 1967 Johnson sought out J. William Fulbright, a Senator, at a White House reception. Llewellyn Thompson, then US ambassador to the USSR, believed that a conference could "start the process of moving toward an understanding with the Soviets". Fulbright even believed that Johnson was reconsidering his Vietnam strategy. Later Fulbright wrote two letters to Johnson about the importance of a summit between the two nations. Johnson agreed, and wrote a letter in return, which said they were waiting for a Soviet response for US invitation. Walt Rostow, the National Security Advisor at the time, said it was a 20 percent chance of the summit having a good effect on Soviet–US relations, and only a 10 percent chance of the summit going awry.

The Soviet Political Bureau (Politburo) were divided over the usefulness of the summit. Andrei Gromyko, the Minister of Foreign Affairs at the time and still not a member of the Politburo, was able to win support for it. Gromyko noted that Soviet-US dialogue which had been suspended in 1963 should be reactivated, despite the Vietnam War putting a great deal strain on the two countries' relations.

Kosygin had agreed to address the United Nations and as such, wished to conduct the summit in New York. Johnson, wary of encountering protesters against the war in Vietnam, preferred to meet in Washington, D.C. Roughly equidistant, Hollybush, the residence of the President of Glassboro State College (now Rowan University) in Glassboro, New Jersey was selected as a compromise.

The summit

Vietnam War

In their first meeting held on 23 June 1967 there were only four people present, Alexei Kosygin and Lyndon B. Johnson and their respective interpreters. The main subjects discussed between the two was the ongoing crisis in the Middle East and the Soviet-US arms race. Towards the end of the meeting, Johnson said he was willing to discuss a peace settlement regarding war in Vietnam; literally meaning dividing the country in half, one part communist another part capitalist. He assured Kosygin that the only reason for American bombing in North Vietnam was because of North Vietnamese intervention into South Vietnam. Johnson offered the Soviets to supervise the democratic election in South Vietnam in the aftermath of the war. Kosygin responded by returning to the original subject; the crisis in the Middle East. During their afternoon meeting, Kosygin told Johnson that he was recently in contact with Phạm Văn Đồng, the Prime Minister of North Vietnam, and that they had discussed the possibilities on putting an end to the war. The North Vietnamese reply came during Kosygin's lunch with Johnson. Kosygin compared the Vietnam War with the Algerian War which ended when Charles de Gaulle's France signed a peace treaty signifying the end of French colonisation of Algeria; he believed this would happen to the United States if the war continued. He also made it very clear that the North Vietnamese would not give up their goal of a unified Vietnam that easily.

Johnson was worried of North Vietnamese betrayal, saying he would be "crucified" politically in the United States if the North Vietnamese decided to send their troops into South Vietnam if and when the United States stopped bombing them. Kosygin said, relieving Johnson of his worries, that a North Vietnamese delegation could meet anywhere in the world to discuss a peace settlement with the Americans.

The Spirit of Glassboro
The two world leaders met for three days, from June 23 to June 25, 1967, at Hollybush Mansion, home of the college president. Although Johnson and Kosygin failed to reach agreement on limiting anti-ballistic missile systems, the generally amicable atmosphere of the summit was referred to as the "Spirit of Glassboro".

See also
 List of Soviet Union–United States summits (1943 to 1991)

References
Notes

Bibliography

External links
 US State Department "This Day in Diplomacy" June 23, 1997
 "A Few Famous Days", Rowan Magazine, Vol. XII, No. 3, Summer 2007 

History of New Jersey
Rowan University
1967 in the United States
Soviet Union–United States diplomatic conferences
Diplomatic conferences in the United States
Glassboro, New Jersey
1967 in international relations
1967 in New Jersey
1967 conferences